Ab Barik (also Romanized as Āb Bārīk, Āb-e Bārīk, and Āb-ī-Bārīk) is a village in Abrumand Rural District, in the Central District of Bahar County, Hamadan Province, Iran. At the 2006 census, its population was 198, in 37 families.

References 

Populated places in Bahar County